The 1979–80 UC Irvine Anteaters men's basketball team represented the University of California, Irvine during the 1979–80 NCAA Division I men's basketball season. The Anteaters were led by eleventh year head coach Tim Tift and played their home games at Crawford Hall. They were members of the Pacific Coast Athletic Association. They finished the season 4–18 and 1–13 in PCAA play.

Previous season 
The 1978–79 Anteaters finished the season with a record of 9–17 and 3–11 in PCAA play. The anteaters were invited to the PCAA tournament for the first time and were eliminated Pacific Tigers in the first round.

Off-season

Recruits

1979 Recruiting Class

Source

Roster

Schedule

|-
!colspan=9 style="background:#002244; color:#FFDE6C;"| Regular season

|-
!colspan=9 style="background:#002244; color:#FFDE6C;"| PCAA tournament

Source

Awards and honors
Victor Conyers
PCAA Second Team All-Conference

Notes

References

UC Irvine Anteaters men's basketball seasons
UC Irvine
UC Irvine Anteaters
UC Irvine Anteaters